A teardrop is a drop (liquid) of tears.

Teardrop or Teardrops may also refer to:

Biology
 Vastus medialis, a muscle in the leg sometimes referred to as the teardrop muscle
 A feature in X-rays of the pelvis

Music

Musical Groups
 The Teardrops, or Magic Slim and The Teardrops, a Chicago band
 The Teardrops (UK band), a post-punk band from Manchester, England
 The Teardrops (girl group), a 1960s girl group from Cincinnati, Ohio

Instruments
 The unofficial name of the Mark III, and Mark VI electric guitars made by Vox

Albums
 Teardrops (album), a 2010 album by Tom Dice

Songs
 "Tear Drops", a 1957 song by Lee Andrews & the Hearts
 "Tear Drop", a 1959 US#23 Santo & Johnny instrumental
 "Teardrops" (George Harrison song), a 1981 song on George Harrison's album Somewhere In England
 "Teardrops" (Shakin' Stevens song), a 1984 song on Shakin' Stevens compilation album Greatest Hits
 "Teardrops" (Womack & Womack song), a 1988 song on Womack & Womack's album Conscience
 "Teardrops", a song by The Proclaimers from their 1988 album Sunshine on Leith
 "Teardrops" (George Ducas song), 1994
 "Teardrop" (song), a song on Massive Attack's 1998 album Mezzanine
 "Teardrops" (The 411 song), a 2004 song from British R&B group The 411
 "Teardrops" (Elena Paparizou song), 2006
 "Tear Drops", a song from B5's 2007 album Don't Talk, Just Listen
 "Teardrop" (Lolawolf song), 2014
 "Teardrops" (Bring Me the Horizon song), 2020
 "Teardrops", a 2020 song by Joe Satriani from Shapeshifting

Places 
 Tear Drop Memorial, a sculpture memorial to the victims of the September 11 terrorist attacks
 Teardrop Park, a public park in lower Manhattan, near the site of the World Trade Center
 Teardrop Pond, a meltwater pond in Marie Byrd Land

Species
 Teardrop white-eye, a bird in the family Zosteropidae
 Teardrop butterflyfish, a species of butterflyfish (family Chaetodontidae)
 Teardrop darter, a species of darter endemic to the eastern United States

Technology
 Teardrop attacks, a remote denial-of-service attack (DoS)
 Teardrop trailer, a type of travel trailer
 Teardrop trailer (truck), an aerodynamically shaped semi-trailer with a curved-roof
 Teardrop hull, a submarine hull design
 T150 C 'Teardrop', a classic car made by Talbot-Lago
 Teardrop (electronics), a printed circuit board feature
 Lighting designed by Tokujin Yoshioka

Other uses
 
 Teardrop (basketball), a basketball move usually performed by undersized players
 Teardrop tattoo, a tattoo in the sign of a teardrop used by various gang members
 A type of stroke ending in typography
 Teardrop turn, a method of reversing the course of an aircraft or vessel